The 1966–67 season is Real Madrid Club de Fútbol's 64th season in existence and the club's 35th consecutive season in the top flight of Spanish football.

Summary 
During Autumn the team lost the 1966 Intercontinental Cup against Uruguayan side Peñarol, being defeated the two matches of the series. The club won its 12th League title ever, finishing five points above runners-up CF Barcelona. New arrivals were Junquera from Langreo, Zunzunegui, Chato Gonzalez and midfielder Juanito both from Rayo Vallecano, also Rovira from RCD Mallorca. Left the club retiring of football were Uruguayan central defender José Santamaría and after eight campaigns Hungarian striker Ferenc Puskás too. Also, Aguero was transferred out to Granada, Isidro to Sabadell, Morollón to Valladolid, Pedro Casado to Sabadell and Pipi Suarez to Sevilla.

In the Copa del Generalísimo the club was eliminated by Valencia CF in the quarterfinals. Meanwhile, in the European Cup the squad was defeated by Helenio Herrera's Internazionale in the quarterfinals, losing the two matches of the series (0–1 in Madrid and 0–2 in Milan).

Squad

Transfers

Competitions

La Liga

Position by Round

League table

Matches

Copa del Generalísimo

Round of 32

Eightfinals

Quarter-finals

European Cup

Eightfinals

Quarter-finals

Intercontinental Cup

Statistics

Players statistics

See also 
 Yé-yé (Real Madrid)

References

External links 
 BDFútbol

Real Madrid CF seasons
Spanish football championship-winning seasons
Real Madrid